Maia (Ancient Greek: Μαῖα; also spelled Maie,), in ancient Greek religion and mythology, is one of the Pleiades and the mother of Hermes, one of the major Greek gods, by Zeus, the king of Olympus.

Family 
Maia is the daughter of Atlas and Pleione the Oceanid, and is the oldest of the seven Pleiades. They were born on Mount Cyllene in Arcadia, and are sometimes called mountain nymphs, oreads; Simonides of Ceos sang of "mountain Maia" (Maiados oureias) "of the lovely black eyes." Because they were daughters of Atlas, they were also called the Atlantides.

Mythology

Birth of Hermes 
According to the Homeric Hymn to Hermes, Zeus, in the dead of night, secretly made love to Maia, who avoided the company of the gods, in a cave of Cyllene. She became pregnant with Hermes. After giving birth to the baby, Maia wrapped him in blankets and went to sleep.  The rapidly maturing infant Hermes crawled away to Thessaly, where by nightfall of his first day he stole some of his half-brother Apollo's cattle and invented the lyre from a tortoise shell. Maia refused to believe Apollo when he claimed that Hermes was the thief, and Zeus then sided with Apollo. Finally, Apollo exchanged the cattle for the lyre, which became one of his identifying attributes.

Although the Homeric Hymn has Maia as Hermes' caretaker and guardian, in Sophocles's now lost satyr play Ichneutae, Maia entrusted the infant Hermes to Cyllene (the local mountain goddess) to nurse and raise, and thus it is her that the satyrs and Apollo confront when looking for the god's missing cattle.

As nurturer 
Maia also raised the infant Arcas, the child of Callisto with Zeus. Wronged by the love affair, Zeus' wife Hera in a jealous rage had transformed Callisto into a bear. Arcas is the eponym of Arcadia, where Maia was born. The story of Callisto and Arcas, like that of the Pleiades, is an aition for a stellar formation, the constellations Ursa Major and Ursa Minor, the Great and Little Bear.

Her name is related to μαῖα (maia), an honorific term for older women related to μήτηρ (mētēr) 'mother', also meaning "midwife" in Greek.

Roman Maia 

In ancient Roman religion and myth, Maia embodied the concept of growth, as her name was thought to be related to the comparative adjective maius, maior "larger, greater". Originally, she may have been a homonym independent of the Greek Maia, whose myths she absorbed through the Hellenization of Latin literature and culture.

In an archaic Roman prayer, Maia appears as an attribute of Vulcan, in an invocational list of male deities paired with female abstractions representing some aspect of their functionality. She was explicitly identified with Earth (Terra, the Roman counterpart of Gaia) and the Good Goddess (Bona Dea) in at least one tradition. Her identity became theologically intertwined also with the goddesses Fauna, Ops, Juno, Carna, and the Magna Mater ("Great Goddess", referring to the Roman form of Cybele but also a cult title for Maia), as discussed at some length by the late antiquarian writer Macrobius. This treatment was probably influenced by the 1st-century BC scholar Varro, who tended to resolve a great number of goddesses into one original "Terra". The association with Juno, whose Etruscan counterpart was Uni, is suggested again by the inscription Uni Mae on the Piacenza Liver.

The month of May (Latin Maius) was named for Maia, though ancient etymologists also connected it to the maiores "ancestors", again from the adjective maius, maior, meaning those who are "greater" in terms of generational precedence. On the first day of May, the Lares Praestites were honored as protectors of the city, and the flamen of Vulcan sacrificed a pregnant sow to Maia, a customary offering to an earth goddess that reiterates the link between Vulcan and Maia in the archaic prayer formula. In Roman myth, Mercury (Hermes), the son of Maia, was the father of the twin Lares, a genealogy that sheds light on the collocation of ceremonies on the Kalends of May. On May 15, the Ides, Mercury was honored as a patron of merchants and increaser of profit (through an etymological connection with merx, merces, "goods, merchandise"), another possible connection with Maia his mother as a goddess who promoted growth.

See also 
 66 Maja, asteroid
 Bona Dea
 Maia (star)
 Maiasaura
 Rosmerta

Notes

References 
Apollodorus, The Library with an English Translation by Sir James George Frazer, F.B.A., F.R.S. in 2 Volumes, Cambridge, MA, Harvard University Press; London, William Heinemann Ltd. 1921. ISBN 0-674-99135-4. Online version at the Perseus Digital Library. Greek text available from the same website.
Diodorus Siculus, The Library of History translated by Charles Henry Oldfather. Twelve volumes. Loeb Classical Library. Cambridge, Massachusetts: Harvard University Press; London: William Heinemann, Ltd. 1989. Vol. 3. Books 4.59–8. Online version at Bill Thayer's Web Site
Diodorus Siculus, Bibliotheca Historica. Vol 1-2. Immanel Bekker. Ludwig Dindorf. Friedrich Vogel. in aedibus B. G. Teubneri. Leipzig. 1888-1890. Greek text available at the Perseus Digital Library.
Hesiod, Theogony from The Homeric Hymns and Homerica with an English Translation by Hugh G. Evelyn-White, Cambridge, MA.,Harvard University Press; London, William Heinemann Ltd. 1914. Online version at the Perseus Digital Library. Greek text available from the same website.
Publius Ovidius Naso, Fasti translated by James G. Frazer. Online version at the Topos Text Project.
Publius Ovidius Naso, Fasti. Sir James George Frazer. London; Cambridge, MA. William Heinemann Ltd.; Harvard University Press. 1933. Latin text available at the Perseus Digital Library.
The Homeric Hymns and Homerica with an English Translation by Hugh G. Evelyn-White. Homeric Hymns. Cambridge, MA.,Harvard University Press; London, William Heinemann Ltd. 1914. Online version at the Perseus Digital Library. Greek text available from the same website.

Further reading 
 Grimal, Pierre, The Dictionary of Classical Mythology, Wiley-Blackwell, 1996, . "Maia" p. 270
 Harry Thurston Peck, Harper's Dictionary of Classical Antiquities, 1898
 Smith, William; Dictionary of Greek and Roman Biography and Mythology, London (1873). "Maia"
 Encyclopædia Britannica, 1911.

Pleiades (Greek mythology)
Harvest goddesses
Nymphs
Mountain goddesses
Nature goddesses
Mothers of the twelve Olympians
Divine women of Zeus
Arcadian characters in Greek mythology
Arcadian mythology
Roman goddesses
Characters in Roman mythology